Anatoly Fradis (born September 26, 1948) is an actor, film director, producer and entrepreneur.

Early life

Anatoly was born into a film family as a third-generation filmmaker. His grandfather, Akiva Fradis, was one of the original founders of the Film Studio in the City of Odessa, on the Black Sea, in 1919. Then, his father, Adolf Fradis,  worked at the same studio since 1933, as UPM and executive producer of such acclaimed Russian films as Mysterious Island, Tanker Derbent and The Shooting Party.  After fighting in World War II, Adolf Fradis came back in 1945 to work for the same studio and successfully produced more than 66 films for Odessa Film Studios and, later, Mosfilm Studios, Moscow, during a long career, which ended by his death in 1982. Anatoly's mother was a film editor, and his sister, Tatiana, was a sound designer for Russian Television.

Early career in Russia

In his early childhood, during the 1950s, Anatoly Fradis was a famous child actor, starring in the acclaimed Russian film White Poodle.  He also acted in the Odessa Russian Theatre. In 1966, his entire family moved to Moscow, where Anatoly graduated in 1970 from the celebrated Schepkin Drama School and later from the High Courses of Scriptwriters and Film Directors. Anatoly Fradis worked as a film director for Mosfilm Studios, Moscow, the largest and oldest studio in Europe and the USSR, from the time he was twenty until he departed for the United States in 1979. During his Mosfilm's years, Mr. Fradis worked as First AD and Director on such well-known films as Front Behind the Front Lines and Live on Their Own.

In the United States

Upon his arrival to the United States in 1979, Mr. Fradis began his career as a promoter and impresario. He promoted primarily Eastern European films and live shows from the former USSR, Poland, Hungary, Bulgaria and Yugoslavia and toured them throughout the US, Canada and Western Europe. He was involved in bringing many acclaimed performers, such as George Marianovich, Radmila Karaklajić, Yanosh Koosh, Karel Gott, Lili Ivanova, the Romen Theatre (Moscow Gypsy Theatre), Jewish Theatre, Warsaw, and one of the greatest Spanish film stars and singers, Sarita Montiel, with Spanish Ballet Fuego Flamenco into the US, as well as many American performers such as José Feliciano and Johnny Cash to Eastern Europe.

His company, AFRA Film Enterprises, was formed in 1980 to promote mainly Russian and Eastern European films. Under exclusive contractual arrangement with Film Polski, AFRA obtained critically acclaimed Polish art films, many of which were shelved during martial law. During this period Fradis and his company served as a bridge between Polish cinema and serious American film audiences. Since 1987, Fradis and his company has represented Mosfilm Studios, Russia, in the US and Canada, serving as a liaison between Mosfilm and several production companies in America and Europe, arranging co-productions and service deals including Back in the USSR for 20th Century Fox/Largo Entertainment and The Inner Circle for Columbia Pictures. Fradis was instrumental in bringing first major American motion pictures for private distribution in the USSR, including Rambo – First Blood, Gone with the Wind, Wanted Dead or Alive, Stella, Elvira, Mistress of the Dark and many others. Since 1990, Fradis became one of the major suppliers of American films to the USSR, selling to Russia as many as 60 films per year. For more than fifteen years AFRA-FILM and MOSFILM/USA were arranging and coordinating Mosfilm's efforts in Cannes, Milan and Los Angeles during respective film festivals and markets.

Among other diversified activities, Fradis owns and/or controls several companies with business activities ranging from film distribution services to theatre construction and management. One of Fradis' companies, International Business Consortium Corporation, was exclusively representing the Samsung Group and its electronic products for the territory of Poland since 1985 until 1995. Fradis still maintains very strong relations with the Samsung Group, which is also involved in worldwide film distribution and exhibition.

Using his extensive contacts in Russia and Eastern Europe, Fradis produced two films during 1992 to 1993 in partnership with Roger Corman's Concord-New Horizons, Haunted Symphony and Burial of the Rats, as well as, in 1994, an action-thriller Beyond Forgiveness for Showtime/Nu Image. In 1996, Fradis produced two films, Marquis De Sade for Showtime and Termination Man for Saban Entertainment. From 1996 to 1997, Fradis financed and produced the film Business for Pleasure in partnership with Zalman King Productions for Showtime, where he worked in Austria and established very good relations with the Vienna Film Financing Fund and German banks. Since then, he was able to arrange co-financing for several American films to be shot in Austria and Germany. In 1998, Fradis produced several episodes of a highly popular TV series, Zalman King's Red Shoe Diaries for Showtime, and an action-thriller Black Sea-213 for HBO/Playboy International.

Since 1998, Fradis was included in The Marquis Who's Who in America for his outstanding achievements in his field of endeavors and for his significant contributions to the betterment of contemporary society.

In 1999, Fradis and his partners from Northern California established a new company, Theatre Promotions Management Corporation, which was involved in the renovation project of the October cinema in Moscow, supplying the 11-screen multiplex with super-advanced film projection, sound and concert equipment. Also, Fradis was involved in the construction of a 14-screen multiplex in downtown Seoul, South Korea and several multiplexes in Warsaw, Poland.

In 2002, Fradis, together with his long-time associate, entertainment banker Joseph Cohen, established new financing and production entity, which financed and executive produced Bob Dylan's Masked and Anonymous, distributed in the United States by Sony Classics. In 2005 to 2006, Fradis financed and produced in Bucharest, Romania, two sequels to the popular Return of the Living Dead franchise, Return of the Living Dead: Necropolis and Return of the Living Dead: Rave to the Grave, which were sold for the distribution in the United States to NBC-Universal Studios, SyFy Channel and Lions Gate Entertainment. In 2006, Fradis purchased film rights to the highly acclaimed literary properties: Babi Yar by Anatoly Kuznetsov, The Gadfly (OVOD) by Ethel Lillian Voynich and The Man Who Held The Queen To Ransom And Sent Parliament Packing by Peter Van Greenaway.

In 2009–2010, Fradis co-produced the American version (in English) of a major Russian motion picture, Anna Karenina, directed by world-renowned director, Sergei Solovyov.

In November 2014, Mr. Fradis brought the world-renowned Jewish Theater from Warsaw, Poland, with a spectacular musical show, Masel Tov, which was performed to a sold-out audiences in Los Angeles, San Francisco, New York and Philadelphia.
 
In 2015, Mr. Fradis organized the 1st Hollywood Festival of the best Ukrainian Films, which took place at the Laemmle Fine Arts Theater in Los Angeles, and was a great success.

Also, Fradis and Vulich, under the auspices of their new company, Aurora CineStreem Corporation, spent last two years building a unique and incomparable Internet IPTV streaming device, Aurora Professional STB, which the company is successfully implementing in Russia, Poland, Italy, France and South-East Asia.

Anatoly Fradis is in active pre-production on a $25 million major motion picture, Babi Yar, to be filmed in Ukraine and Romania and directed by Academy Award-winner, Barry Levinson (Diner, Rain Man, Avalon). Also, in development and production are several other projects, including Off Center: The Paul Lynde Story and Amphibian Man (Directed by Argentinian director, Serge Rachmanin) .

Presently, Mr. Fradis just completed Co-Producing a major Russian-American basketball picture, Going Vertical, directed by Anton Megerdichev (Metro).

References

External links

Anatoly Fradis  at Kino-Teatr.ru 
Return of the Living Dead 4 and 5  Official website

American film producers
Living people
1948 births
Russian male child actors
Male actors from Moscow
Russian male stage actors
Soviet emigrants to the United States
Russian male film actors
Russian businesspeople in the United States